Tachysurus fulvidraco, the yellowhead catfish or Korean bullhead, is a species of bagrid catfish found in eastern Asia from Siberia to China, Korea, Vietnam, and Laos, where it can be found in lakes and river channels.  It can reach a maximum length of 34.5 cm (13.5 in), weighing 3 kg (6.6 lb), though it is much more commonly found to a length of 8 cm.  It is a minor component of commercial fisheries.

Parasites 
A total of 11 species of helminthes, including six species of digeneans, three species of nematodes, a species of cestode, and an acanthocephalan have been found in the stomach and intestines of T. fulvidraco:.
 Genarchopsis goppo
 Orientocreadium siluri
 Coitocoecum plagiorchis
 Echinoparyphium lingulatum
 Dollfustrema vaneyi
 Opisthorchis parasiluri
 Procamallanus fulvidraconis
 Spinitectus gigi
 Camallanus cotti
 Gangesia pseudobagri
 Hebsoma violentum

References 

Bagridae
Catfish of Asia
Freshwater fish of Asia
Freshwater fish of China
Freshwater fish of Japan
Fish of Russia
Fish of Southeast Asia
Taxa named by John Richardson (naturalist)
Fish described in 1846